Æthelred II or Ethelred II may refer to:

Æthelred II of East Anglia, king 870s
Æthelred II of Northumbria, king 840s/850s
Æthelred the Unready, also Æthelred II of England, king 978–1016